Woojin Industrial Systems Company Limited is a South Korean manufacturer of rolling stock including metro, electric bus, peoplemover and monorail vehicles.

Customers

Heavy rail
 Indonesia
 Kualanamu Airport Rail Link
 INKA CC300: supplier of master controller
South Korea
Korail Class 312000
Korail Class 3000

Metros
 Philippines
 LRTA 2000 class: manufacturer of new train propulsion and monitoring systems for three train sets
 South Korea
 Busan Metro EMU Class 4000
 Seoul Metro 5000 series
 Seoul Metro 7000 series
 Seoul Metro 8000 series

Peoplemovers and monorails
 Indonesia
 Soekarno–Hatta Airport Skytrain
 South Korea
 Daegu Metro Class 3000

References

Rail vehicle manufacturers of South Korea